Cephalotaxaceae is a small grouping of conifers, that included one to three genera closely allied to Taxaceae. However, members of Cephalotaxaceae are now included in Taxaceae by botanists, instead of as a distinct family, based on phylogenetic evidence and close morphological similarities between them.  Included species were restricted to east Asia, except for two species of Torreya found in the southwest and southeast of the United States; fossil evidence shows a much wider prehistorical Northern Hemisphere distribution. The most notable differences between Taxaceae and Cephalotaxaceae concerned the cone aril, which fully encloses the seeds of Cephalotaxaceae, the longer maturation of Cephalotaxaceae seeds and the larger size of the mature seeds.

When considered as a distinct family, members of Cephalotaxaceae are much branched, small trees and shrubs. The leaves are evergreen, spirally arranged, often twisted at the base to appear biranked. They are linear to lanceolate, and have pale green or white stomatal bands on the undersides. The plants are monoecious, subdioecious, or dioecious. The male cones are 4–25 mm long, and shed pollen in the early spring. The female cones are reduced, with one to a few ovuliferous scales, and one seed on each ovuliferous scale. As the seed matures, the ovuliferous scale develops into a fleshy aril fully enclosing the seed. The mature aril is thin, green, purple or red, soft and resinous. Each ovuliferous scale remains discrete, so the cone develops into a short stem with one to a few berry-like seeds. They are probably eaten by birds or other animals which then disperse the hard seed undamaged in their droppings, but seed dispersal mechanisms in the family are not yet well researched.

References

 
Pinales families
Historically recognized plant families